Maşxan (also, Mashkhan) is a village and municipality in the Astara Rayon of Azerbaijan.  It has a population of 2,518.

References 

Populated places in Astara District